The Wildlife Trust of India (WTI) is an Indian nature conservation organisation.

WTI was formed in November 1969 in New Delhi, India, as a response to the rapidly deteriorating condition of wildlife in India. WTI is a registered charity in India (under Section 12A of the Income Tax Act, 1961).

Priority landscapes
WTI currently focuses its resources on six priority landscapes – northeast India, western Himalayas, terai, southern Ghats system, central India and terrestrial ecosystems.   One of its projects in to protect the Sarus crane.

Jointly run centres
The Centre for Wildlife Rehabilitation and Conservation is a wildlife care facility that is run by Wildlife Trust of India and Assam Forest Department, with financial support from International Fund for Animal Welfare.

The Udanti Tiger Reserve in Gariaband district, Chhattisgarh, is run by  Wildlife Trust of India and the Chhattisgarh forest department.

See also

 Bombay Natural History Society (BNHS)
 Sanctuary Asia
 Protected areas of India
 Wildlife Institute of India (WII)
 Zoo Outreach Organisation

References

External links 
 

Wildlife conservation organizations
Environmental organisations based in India
Animal charities based in India
Wildlife conservation in India
Environmental organizations established in 1998
1998 establishments in Delhi